Adrian Township is a township in Jackson County, Kansas, United States.  As of the 2000 census, its population was 150.

Geography
Adrian Township covers an area of 29.83 square miles (77.26 square kilometers); of this, 0.08 square miles (0.2 square kilometers) or 0.26 percent is water. The stream of Long Branch runs through this township.

Adjacent townships
 Grant Township (north)
 Lincoln Township (east)
 Washington Township (south)
 Emmett Township, Pottawatomie County (west)
 St. Clere Township, Pottawatomie County (west)
 Lincoln Township, Pottawatomie County (northwest)

Cemeteries
The township contains two cemeteries: Adrian and Shields.

References
 U.S. Board on Geographic Names (GNIS)
 United States Census Bureau cartographic boundary files

External links
 US-Counties.com
 City-Data.com

Townships in Jackson County, Kansas
Townships in Kansas